Mark Barnett may refer to:
Mark Barnett (motorcyclist) (born 1960), American motocross racer
Mark A. Barnett (born 1963), American judge
Mark Barnett (lawyer) (born 1954), American attorney